Karl Retzlaw  (10 February 1896 – 20 June 1979) was a German politician, representative of the Social Democratic Party, Independent Social Democratic Party of Germany and Communist Party of Germany.

Retzlaw was born Karl Gröhl in Schneidemühl, Province of Posen (today Pila, Poland) and died in Frankfurt.

See also
List of Social Democratic Party of Germany politicians

1896 births
1979 deaths
People from Piła
People from the Province of Posen
Social Democratic Party of Germany politicians
Independent Social Democratic Party politicians
Communist Party of Germany politicians
Union of Persecutees of the Nazi Regime members